Diastylis laevis is a species of crustacean belonging to the order Cumacea and the genus Diastylis. It occurs from Skagerrak to the Côte d'Ivoire, but not in the Mediterranean Sea.

References

Cumacea
Crustaceans of the Atlantic Ocean
Crustaceans described in 1869